Hamid Jokar is an Iranian football forward who currently plays for  Fajr Sepasi.

Career
Jokar started his career with Fajr Sepasi in 2010. He moved to Gostaresh Foolad in the summer of 2014.

References

External links 
Hamid Jokar at PersianLeague.com

Iranian footballers
Association football defenders
Fajr Sepasi players
1987 births
Living people